Durell may refer to:

Persons 
 Birgitta Durell (1619–1683), Swedish industrialist
 C. V. Durell (1882–1968), schoolmaster who wrote mathematical textbooks.
 Daniel Meserve Durell (1769–1841), U.S. Representative from New Hampshire
 Durell Peaden, a Republican member of the Florida Senate, representing the 2nd District since 2001.
 Durell Taylor, American football player
 Edward Durell Stone (1902–1978), American modernist twentieth century architect.
 Edward Henry Durell, the 25th mayor of New Orleans (1863).

Other 
 Durell Software UK producer of Accounting software, previously well known for ZX Spectrum games.

See also
 Yvon Durelle
 Durrell